Walter Wayne Backman (born September 22, 1959) is an American former Major League Baseball second baseman. He is best known for his time with the New York Mets from – and was a member of their 1986 World Series-winning team. He was also the former manager for the Las Vegas 51s, the Mets' AAA minor league team, from 2013 to 2016. He served as the bench coach for the Pericos de Puebla of the Mexican Baseball League in 2017. He is currently the manager of the Long Island Ducks of the Atlantic League of Professional Baseball.

Playing career

New York Mets

First round pick
Backman was the Mets' first round pick in the 1977 Major League Baseball draft (sixteenth overall). He was assigned to the New York–Penn League's Little Falls Mets upon signing, and batted .325 with six home runs in his first professional season. Making his major league debut starting at second base against the Los Angeles Dodgers at Dodger Stadium on September 2, Backman got a single in his first at-bat, driving in Claudell Washington for his first major league run batted in.

He batted .280, and finished second on the club to Mookie Wilson (46) with 32 stolen bases.

1986

Prior to the start of the  season, general manager Frank Cashen brought in Tim Teufel, a right-handed hitting infielder from the Minnesota Twins  for Billy Beane, Joe Klink and Bill Latham. He and Backman formed a platoon at second base, and along with Wilson and Lenny Dykstra, provided a "spark" at the top of the Mets' line up, and set the table for the heavy hitters who batted behind them.

For his own part, Backman scored 67 runs, stole 13 bases and batted over .300 (.320) for the first time in his career for the team that won 108 games and took the National League East by 21.5 games. He batted .333 in the World Series against the Boston Red Sox and led off for the Mets in the now famous tenth inning of Game 6 with a fly out to Jim Rice.

1988
Backman and Teufel were still platooning at second base in  when the Mets won their division for the second time during Backman's tenure with the team. Backman batted .303 for the division winners, and the Mets won 100 games that season, taking the NL East by fifteen games over the Pittsburgh Pirates. However, the heavily favored Mets lost to the Los Angeles Dodgers in the 1988 National League Championship Series. Backman played respectably in the division series (.273 avg., 2 runs, 2 RBIs). However, following the season, the Mets sent him and Mike Santiago to the Minnesota Twins for Jeff Bumgarner, Steve Gasser and Toby Nivens, none of whom emerged as a major leaguer.

Pittsburgh Pirates
After only one season in Minnesota, Backman signed as a free agent with the Mets' division rivals, the Pittsburgh Pirates. With slick fielder José Lind already at second base for the Pirates, Backman received most of his playing time backing up Jeff King at third.

The Pirates opened the  against the Mets at Shea Stadium. In front of his former home crowd, Backman went two for five with a single and triple and scored two runs in the Pirates' 12–3 victory over the Mets. Against the San Diego Padres on April 27, Backman accomplished the rare feat of six hits in a nine inning game. For the season, Backman batted .292 and scored 62 runs for a Pirates team that went 95–67, and took the division by four games over the Mets.

1991–1993
He joined the Seattle Mariners, but was released 38 games into the season with a .138 batting average with only two runs scored in 31 plate appearances.

Backman had a career .980 fielding percentage at second base.

Managing career

After retiring as a player, Backman was inducted into the Oregon Sports Hall of Fame in 2002. In 1998, Backman managed the Bend Bandits of Bend, Oregon during their final season of operations in the Western Baseball League.  They finished 2nd in the North Division at 43–46. Backman led the 2002 Birmingham Barons (Chicago White Sox double A Southern League affiliate) to a 79–61 record. In 2004, he led the Lancaster JetHawks, the Arizona Diamondbacks High A team, to an 86–54 record and was named Sporting News "Minor League Manager of the Year".

On November 1, 2004, Backman was promoted to manager of the Arizona Diamondbacks' major league squad. However, in its story about Backman's hire, The New York Times reported that Backman had serious legal and financial problems. He had been arrested in 1999 for DUI in Kennewick, Washington as documented on HBO Real Sports with Bryant Gumbel. A year later, he was arrested in connection with an altercation in his home in Prineville, Oregon. In addition, Backman had declared Chapter 7 bankruptcy. The Diamondbacks initially stood by him, but fired him on November 5, just four days after his hiring. Managing partner Ken Kendrick admitted that the Diamondbacks had not fully vetted Backman before hiring him. He added that the Diamondbacks only learned about the extent of Backman's problems when the Times report prompted the team to conduct its own investigation, which revealed that Backman had misled team officials about his past.

Backman began his managerial comeback with the South Georgia Peanuts of the independent South Coast League. His return to managing was documented by the TV series Playing for Peanuts. The Peanuts won their league with a 59–28 record. The South Georgia Peanuts then went on to win the league championship that season under Backman's leadership.

In December 2007, Backman became manager of the Joliet JackHammers. With the team in sixth place in the Northern League with a 24–42 record, he was fired on July 30, 2009. In October 2009, Backman's name circulated as a likely candidate for the Mets' double A managerial job with the Binghamton Mets; however, the Mets decided instead to promote Teufel from the St. Lucie Mets, and Backman was given the St. Lucie job. Two weeks later, the Mets changed their minds, and Backman was handed the reins to the Brooklyn Cyclones instead. Backman went on to lead the Cyclones to a league-best 51–24 record, winning the McNamara Division of the New York–Penn League by 12 games. However, the Cyclones were ultimately swept by the Tri-City ValleyCats in the league championship series.

Backman was a candidate to replace Jerry Manuel as the New York Mets' major league manager in 2011, having interviewed for the position with new General Manager Sandy Alderson. After a second round of interviews in which Backman was a finalist, however, the position went to Terry Collins.  Backman was subsequently named manager of the Mets' double A affiliate, the Binghamton Mets.

In Backman's first season in Binghamton, the club had a 65–76 record. Backman remained highly regarded in the Mets organization, and was promoted to manager of their AAA affiliate, the Buffalo Bisons for the 2012 season.

In 2013, Backman managed the Mets' new AAA affiliate, the Las Vegas 51s, leading them to an 81–63 record and winning the Pacific Coast League's Pacific South Division title. Las Vegas lost to Salt Lake three-games-to-one in the Conference Championship Series. Backman returned to the 51s for the 2014 season, and the team once again advanced to the playoffs. On August 29, 2014, Backman was announced as the PCL Manager of the Year.

Backman resigned from the Las Vegas 51s on September 12, 2016. However, in later interviews, Backman claims that he was forced out as manager, and received phone calls telling him that he'd be fired if he didn't resign. Backman told sportswriter Bob Klapisch that the Mets were angered at his perceived mishandling of two top Mets prospects, Michael Conforto and Brandon Nimmo. He also believed that general manager Sandy Alderson and owner Fred Wilpon believed him too independent-minded and outspoken for their liking. Spending the winter getting turned down by many clubs, Backman became convinced that Mets GM Sandy Alderson had "blackballed" him, and said a friend had tipped him off that Alderson was working against him. Alderson declined to respond to Backman's allegation, although a member of the organization insisted that despite their differences, Alderson would never go as far as to deliberately sabotage Backman.

In 2017, Backman signed on as manager of the Acereros de Monclova of the Mexican Baseball League. On May 19, 2017, 42 games into the season, Backman was fired. Shortly after, Backman was hired as the bench coach for the Pericos de Puebla.

Backman was named manager of the New Britain Bees of the Atlantic League of Professional Baseball for the 2018 season on November 17th, 2017. On November 28, 2018, Backman was announced as the new manager of the Atlantic League's Long Island Ducks for the 2019 season.

Backman has been described as a players' manager and noted for his "old school" style, as well as for his frequent use of humor when delivering news of a promotion to the major leagues.

See also
List of Major League Baseball single-game hits leaders

References

External links

Wally Backman at SABR (Baseball BioProject)
Wally Backman at Baseball Almanac
Wally Backman at Baseballbiography.com
Wally Backman at Ultimate Mets Database

1959 births
Living people
American expatriate baseball people in Mexico
Arizona Diamondbacks managers
Baseball coaches from Oregon
Baseball players from Oregon
Binghamton Mets managers
Birmingham Barons managers
Brooklyn Cyclones managers
Buffalo Bisons (minor league) managers
Jackson Mets players
Las Vegas 51s managers
Little Falls Mets players
Lynchburg Mets players
Major League Baseball second basemen
Major League Baseball shortstops
Major League Baseball third basemen
Mexican League baseball managers
Minnesota Twins players
New York Mets players
Northern League (baseball, 1993–2010) managers
People from Prineville, Oregon
Philadelphia Phillies players
Pittsburgh Pirates players
Seattle Mariners players
Sportspeople from Hillsboro, Oregon
Tidewater Tides players
New Britain Bees